Todor Aleksandrov Poporushov, best known as Todor Alexandrov (Bulgarian/Macedonian: Тодор Александров), also spelt as Alexandroff (4 March 1881 – 31 August 1924), was a Bulgarian revolutionary, army officer, politician and teacher, who fought for the freedom of Macedonia as a second Bulgarian state on the Balkans. He was a member of the Internal Macedonian-Adrianople Revolutionary Organisation (IMARO) and later of the Central Committee of the Internal Macedonian Revolutionary Organisation (IMRO).

In North Macedonia, Aleksandrov, who had been previously dismissed by the post-WWII Macedonian historiography as a Bulgarophile has been recently added to the country's historical heritage, already as an ethnic Macedonian. Though, this has caused controversy.

Biography
Aleksandrov was born in Novo Selo,  Kosovo vilayet, the Ottoman Empire (present-day suburb of Štip, North Macedonia) to Aleksandar Poporushev and Marija Aleksandrova. In 1898, he finished the Bulgarian Pedagogical School in Skopje and became a Bulgarian teacher consecutively in the towns of Kočani, Kratovo, the village of Vinica, and Štip. He attended the Bulgarian Men's High School of Thessaloniki.

In 1903, Aleksandrov distinguished himself as an extraordinary leader and organizer of the Kočani Revolutionary District. He was arrested by the Ottoman authorities on 3 March 1903 and sent to Skopje under enforced police escort during the same night. He was sentenced to five years of solitary confinement by the extraordinary court there. In April 1904, he was released after an amnesty. Soon afterwards, he was appointed a head teacher in the Second high-school in Štip. Aleksandrov, in co-operation with Todor Lazarov and Mishe Razvigorov, worked day and night to organize the Štip Revolutionary District. The results of his activities were detected by the Ottoman authorities and in November 1904 he was forbidden to teach. On 10 January 1905, Aleksandrov's house was surrounded by a numerous troops but he succeeded in breaking through the military cordoned and immediately joined the cheta (band) of Mishe Razvigorov where he became its secretary. Aleksandrov attended the First Congress of the Skopje Revolutionary Region as a delegate from the Štip district.

His deteriorating health lead him to become a teacher in Bulgaria — the Black Sea town of Burgas in 1906, but after learning about the death of Mishe Razvigorov, he abandoned his work as a teacher and returned to Macedonia at once. In November 1907, Aleksandrov was elected as a district vojvoda (commander) by the Third Congress of the Skopje Revolutionary District.

On 2 August 1909, the Ottomans made another attempt to arrest him but failed again. In the spring of 1910 he and his cheta traversed the Skopje region and organized the revolutionary activities. In early 1911, Aleksandrov became a member of the Central Committee of the IMARO. In 1912, he became a vojvoda in the Kilkis and Thessaloniki districts where he carried out a number of sabotages against Ottoman targets, facilitating this way the Bulgarian cause in the First Balkan War. He supported the Bulgarian Army.

In 1913, he was at the headquarters of the Third brigade of the Macedonian Militia in the Bulgarian army. After 1913 he organized the IMARO resistance against other nationalities, such as Serbs and Greeks. With the inclusion of Bulgaria in the First World War in October 1915, Todor Alexandrov was mobilized. At that time, the structures of the Military Defense Forces completely merged into the structure of the Bulgarian army. Aleksandrov himself made considerable efforts to organize the administration in the territories occupied by Sabia. On 4 November 1919, Aleksandrov was arrested by the government of Aleksandar Stamboliyski but he succeeded to escape nine days later. In the spring of 1920, Aleksandrov went with a cheta to Vardar Macedonia where he restored the revolutionary organization and attracted the world's attention to the unsolved Macedonian question. At the end of 1922, there was a bounty of 250,000 dinars placed on him by the Serbian authorities in Belgrade.

In 1924 IMRO entered negotiations with the Comintern about collaboration between the communists  and the creation of a united Macedonian movement. The idea for a new unified organization was supported by the Soviet Union, which saw a chance for using this well developed revolutionary movement to spread revolution in the Balkans and destabilize the Balkan monarchies. Alexandrov defended IMRO's independence and refused to concede on practically all points requested by the Communists. No agreement was reached besides a paper "Manifesto" (the so-called May Manifesto of 6 May 1924), in which the objectives of the unified Macedonian liberation movement were presented: independence and unification of partitioned Macedonia, fighting all the neighbouring Balkan monarchies, forming a Balkan Communist Federation and cooperation with the Soviet Union.

Failing to secure Alexandrov's cooperation, the Comintern decided to discredit him and published the contents of the Manifesto on 28 July 1924 in the "Balkan Federation" newspaper. Todor Aleksandrov and Aleksandar Protogerov promptly denied through the Bulgarian press that they have ever signed any agreements, claiming that the May Manifesto was a communist forgery. Shortly after, Alexandrov was assassinated in unclear circumstances, when a member in his cheta shot him on 31 August 1924 in the Pirin Mountains. He had a wife called Vangelia and two children (Alexander and Maria; a strong proponent of her father's ideals and IMRO's charter).

View about the Macedonian Question

IMRO and Alexandrov himself aimed at an autonomous Macedonia, with its capital at Salonika and prevailing Macedonian Bulgarian element. He took into consideration the decomposition of Greece and the incorporation into the autonomous Macedonia of the Macedonian territory which was under the Greek dominion. The part of Macedonia which was in Bulgaria was also foreseen to be incorporated into the autonomous Macedonia. His view does not indicate any doubt about the Bulgarian ethnic character of Macedonian Slavs then.

Controversies in North Macedonia

2008 monument controversy
A local association of Bulgarians raised a monument of the revolutionary on 2 February 2008 in the city of Veles. After the local administration refused to provide a place for the bust it was raised in the yard of a local Bulgarian resident, Dragi Karov. The following night Karov received a number of threats and the monument was twice thrown down by unknown individuals. Soon after, the monument was removed at the insistence of local authorities, as an unlawful construction. This incident caused Bulgarian president Georgi Parvanov to call upon the Macedonian government to review the history of Alexandrov's deeds on his meeting with Branko Crvenkovski in the town of Sandanski.

2012 monument controversy
In June 2012, a new statue called “Macedonian Equestrian Revolutionary” was erected in Skopje. As a consequence, an outcry among older residents erupted almost immediately when they noted the anonymous rider’s similarity to the historical figure. The statue was reportedly commissioned by the Ministry of Culture, but this was in question. The Ministry called the statue “the complete responsibility of the municipality of Kisela Voda (the City of Skopje)”. The city government denied this. 

Attempts to reach a spokesperson at the Ministry of Culture for comment have thus been unsuccessful. Earlier the same month the opposition Social Democrats took to the streets to protest the changing of hundreds of street names, including a bridge that was to be named after Aleksandrov. Finally in October, a few months after the setting of the monument, on it appeared a board with the name of Todor Aleksandrov.

2021 controversy
In the Spring of 2021, the new Skopje municipal council majority by the Social Democratic Union of Macedonia decided to change back the names of many local sites. Thus, the bridge named after Alexandrov and the street named after the organization he led - IMRO, were renamed. The former Skopje Mayor from VMRO-DPMNE Koce Trajanovski reacted that his successor Petre Šilegov has deleted part from the Macedonian history at the request of Bulgaria.

Honours
Aleksandrov Peak on Graham Land, Antarctica is named after Todor Aleksandrov.

Memorials

See also
Internal Macedonian Revolutionary Organization
History of North Macedonia
History of Bulgaria

References and notes

External links
An internet site, dedicated to Todor Aleksandrov
A site dedicated to Todor Alexandrov
 

1881 births
1924 deaths
People from Kosovo vilayet
Macedonian Bulgarians
Members of the Internal Macedonian Revolutionary Organization
Bulgarian revolutionaries
Bulgarian schoolteachers
Macedonia under the Ottoman Empire
Bulgarian military personnel of the Balkan Wars
Bulgarian military personnel of World War I
Recipients of the Iron Cross (1914), 2nd class
Bulgarian Men's High School of Thessaloniki alumni
Prisoners and detainees of the Ottoman Empire
Bulgarian people imprisoned abroad
Recipients of the Order of Military Merit (Bulgaria)
Assassinated Bulgarian people
People murdered in Bulgaria
Deaths by firearm in Bulgaria